Quessenberry is a surname. Notable people with the surname include:

 David Quessenberry (born 1990), American football offensive guard
 Paul Quessenberry (born 1992), American football tight end
 Scott Quessenberry (born 1995), American football offensive guard